In linear algebra, the Schmidt decomposition (named after its originator Erhard Schmidt) refers to a particular way of expressing a vector in the tensor product of two inner product spaces. It has numerous applications in quantum information theory, for example in entanglement characterization and in state purification, and plasticity.

Theorem
Let  and  be Hilbert spaces of dimensions n and m respectively. Assume . For any vector  in the tensor product , there exist orthonormal sets  and  such that , where the scalars  are real, non-negative, and unique up to re-ordering.

Proof
The Schmidt decomposition is essentially a restatement of the singular value decomposition in a different context. A general element of the tensor product

can then be viewed as the n × m matrix

By the singular value decomposition, there exist an n × n unitary U, m × m unitary V, and a positive semidefinite diagonal m × m matrix Σ such that

Write  where  is n × m and we have

The previous expression is then

Then

which proves the claim.

Some observations
Some properties of the Schmidt decomposition are of physical interest.

Spectrum of reduced states
Consider a vector w of the tensor product

in the form of Schmidt decomposition

Form the rank 1 matrix ρ = w w*. Then the partial trace of ρ, with respect to either system A or B, is a diagonal matrix whose non-zero diagonal elements are |αi|2. In other words, the Schmidt decomposition shows that the reduced states of ρ on either subsystem have the same spectrum.

Schmidt rank and entanglement
The strictly positive values  in the Schmidt decomposition of w are its Schmidt coefficients.

If w can be expressed as a product

then w is called a separable state. Otherwise, w is said to be an entangled state. From the Schmidt decomposition, we can see that w is entangled if and only if w has Schmidt rank strictly greater than 1.  Therefore, two subsystems that partition a pure state are entangled if and only if their reduced states are mixed states.

Von Neumann entropy

A consequence of the above comments is that, for pure states, the von Neumann entropy of the reduced states is a well-defined measure of entanglement.

Schmidt-rank vector 
The Schmidt rank is defined for bipartite systems, namely quantum states 

The concept of Schmidt rank can be extended to quantum systems made up of more than two subsystems. 

Consider the tripartite quantum system:

These numbers capture the "amount of entanglement" in the bipartite system when respectively A, B or C are discarded. For these reasons the tripartite system can be described by a vector, namely the Schmidt-rank vector

Multipartite systems 
The concept of Schmidt-rank vector can be likewise extended to systems made up of more than three subsystems through the use of tensors.

Example  
Take the tripartite quantum state 

This kind of system is made possible by encoding the value of a qudit into the orbital angular momentum (OAM) of a photon rather than its spin, since the latter can only take two values.

See also
 Singular value decomposition
 Purification of quantum state

References

Further reading
  

Linear algebra
Singular value decomposition
Quantum information theory
Articles containing proofs